Colette Pechekhonova is a Russian model.

Early life
Pechekhonova was born on March 12, 1980, in Leningrad, now Saint Petersburg. She was a student of ballet from a young age. While in college studying medicine, she sent pictures of herself to various agencies.  The owner of one of them, Cros Coitton of Parisian agency Nathalie Models, noticed her photo and signed her almost immediately.

Career
Pechekhonova's debut into the fashion world was at the Spring/Summer 1999 Fendi show. She walked a total of 40 shows that season, making her an international success. After signing with New York Model Management in 1999, she walked for Calvin Klein as an exclusive. Her career continued until her decision to retire in 2004.

She eventually changed her mind, signing with Nathalie Models once more in 2007. She became a regular favorite with Bottega Veneta. She began booking many editorials as well, posing for magazines like I-D, Vogue, and Velvet.

Since her debut in 1998, she has also walked for Viktor & Rolf, Versace, Christian Dior, Louis Vuitton, Gucci, Alexander McQueen and Givenchy.

Personal life
Pechekhonova made friends with other models like Anouck Lepere, Iris Strubegger, and Eugenia Volodina. She is interested in the subject of cinema.

References

Living people
1980 births
Russian female models